Gabriel Shelly (born in Dublin on 24 October 1968) is an Irish Paralympian. He won gold in Boccia at the 2000 Summer Paralympics and bronze in Boccia at the 2008 Summer Paralympics. He also participated in the 1996, 2004 Games and 2012 Games but did not win medals in those years.

References

External links
 

1968 births
Living people
Paralympic boccia players of Ireland
Paralympic gold medalists for Ireland
Paralympic bronze medalists for Ireland
Paralympic medalists in boccia
Boccia players at the 1996 Summer Paralympics
Boccia players at the 2000 Summer Paralympics
Boccia players at the 2004 Summer Paralympics
Boccia players at the 2008 Summer Paralympics
Boccia players at the 2012 Summer Paralympics
Medalists at the 2000 Summer Paralympics
Medalists at the 2008 Summer Paralympics
Cerebral Palsy category Paralympic competitors
Sportspeople with cerebral palsy
Sportspeople from County Carlow